Alfonso d'Este (10 March 1527 – 1 November 1587) was an Italian nobleman.

Biography
Born at Ferrara, he was the illegitimate son of Alfonso I d'Este, Duke of Ferrara by his lover Laura Dianti. In 1523 his father gave him Montecchio Emilia and turned it into a feudal inheritance for cadet members of his family – in 1569 it was promoted to a marquessate by Maximilian II, Holy Roman Emperor.

Alfonso was legitimated in 1532 by cardinal Innocenzo Cybo and in 1533 by his father Alfonso I. His first marriage followed on 3 January 1549, to Giulia della Rovere, daughter of Francesco Maria I della Rovere, Duke of Urbino and Eleonora Gonzaga. In 1584 he married Violante Signa (1546–1609), though that marriage remained childless.

He died at Ferrara in 1587.

Issue

Alfonso had by Giulia della Rovere the following children:

Alfonso d'Este (1560–1578), married Marfisa d'Este;
Cesare d'Este (1562–1628), married Virginia de' Medici. The legitimacy of the succession was recognized by the Emperor Rudolph II but not by Pope Clement VIII: thus, as Ferrara was nominally a Papal fief, the city was returned to the Papal States, despite the attempts of the young duke, who sought help from the Major Powers to no avail. The Este family thus lost the duchy of Ferrara.
Eleonora d'Este (1561–1637), married Carlo Gesualdo di Venosa;
Ippolita d'Este (1565–1602), married Federico Pico, duke of Mirandola.

He also had one illegitimate child:
Alessandro d'Este (1568–1624), cardinal.

References

1527 births
1587 deaths
Nobility from Ferrara
alfonso